Nationality words link to articles with information on the nation's poetry or literature (for instance, Irish or France).

Events
February – A monument to Scottish poet Robert Burns (died 1796) is opened in Alloway.
May 23 – Russian writer Alexander Pushkin begins work on his verse novel Eugene Onegin.
December – English poet Samuel Taylor Coleridge, suffering from opium addiction, takes up residence at No. 3, The Grove, Highgate, London, a house owned by Dr. James Gillman.
December 23 – Clement Clarke Moore's poem "A Visit from St. Nicholas", also known as "Twas the Night Before Christmas" from its first line, is first published (anonymously) in the Troy, New York, Sentinel, and then other newspapers this year and is largely responsible for the American conception of the character he introduces named as "Santa Claus" (attributed to various authors, including Major Henry Beekman Livingston, but most often now to Moore).

Works published in English

 Robert Bloomfield, Hazelwood Hall, verse drama
 William Lisle Bowles, Ellen Gray; or, The Dead Maiden's Curse
 Edward Lytton Bulwer (later Bulwer-Lytton), Delmour; or, A Tale of a Sylphid, and Other Poems
 Lord Byron:
 Don Juan:
 July 15 – Cantos VI, VII, VIII, with a Preface, were published
 August 29 – Cantos IX, X, XI were published
 December 17 – Cantos XII, XIII, XIV
The Island; or, Christian and His Comrades
 Sir Aubrey de Vere, The Duke of Mercia; The Lamentation of Ireland; and Other Poems
 Ebenezer Elliott, Love
 Felicia Dorothea Hemans:
The Siege of Valencia; The Last Constantine; with Other Poems
 The Vespers of Palermo: A tragedy, verse drama
 Mary Howitt and William Howitt, The Forest Minstrel, and Other Poems
 Leigh Hunt, Ultara Crepidarius, a satire on William Gifford
 Charles Lloyd, Poems
 J. G. Lockhart, Ancient Spanish Ballads, Historical and Romantic
 Robert Millhouse, Blossoms, Being a selection of sonnets. 
 Thomas Moore, The Loves of the Angels
 Bryan Waller Procter, pen name "Barry Cornwall", The Flood of Thessaly, The Girl of Provence, and Other Poems
 Winthrop Mackworth Praed, Lillian
 Percy Bysshe Shelley, Poetical Pieces by the Late Percy Bysshe Shelley
 Helen Maria Williams, Poems on Various Subjects

United States
 George Bancroft, Poems
 Fitz-Greene Halleck, "Alnwick Castle", set in Scotland and contrasts the romantic past with the "bank-note-world" of the present
 James McHenry, Waltham, patriotic poem in three cantos; about George Washington at Valley Forge
 Clement Clarke Moore, "A Visit from St. Nicholas"
 Edward Coote Pinkney, Rudolph, a Byronic narrative poem (later included in Poems 1825)

Works published in other languages
 Alphonse de Lamartine, Nouvelles méditations poétiques, France
 Heinrich Heine, Lyrisches Intermezzo, Germany
 Adam Mickiewicz, Grażyna, an epic poem featuring a Lithuanian prince and a fourteenth-century castle, Poland
 Wilhelm Müller, Wanderlieder von Wilhelm Müller: Die Winterreise. In 12 Liedern (published in the almanack Urania: Taschenbuch auf das Jahr 1823), Germany
 Dionysios Solomos, Hymn to Freedom, which becomes the Greek National Anthem, Greece

Births
Death years link to the corresponding "[year] in poetry" article:
 January 1 – Sándor Petőfi (probably killed in action 1849), Hungarian
 March 26 – Margaret Miller Davidson (died 1838), American
 April 19 – Anna Laetitia Waring (died 1910), Welsh-born poet writing in English
 July 23 – Coventry Patmore (died 1896), English
 October 6 – George Henry Boker (died 1890), American
 November 26 – James Mathewes Legaré (died 1859), American
 December 24 – William Brighty Rands (died 1882), English writer and author of nursery rhymes

Deaths
Birth years link to the corresponding "[year] in poetry" article:
 February 21 – Charles Wolfe (born 1791), Irish
 June 19 – William Combe (born 1742), English miscellaneous writer
 August 19 – Robert Bloomfield (born 1766), English "ploughboy poet" 
 September 29 – George Beattie (born 1786), Scottish
 November 1 – Heinrich Wilhelm von Gerstenberg (born 1737), German poet and critic
 date not known – Ōta Nanpo 大田南畝, the most used pen name of Ōta Tan, whose other pen names include Yomo no Akara, Yomo Sanjin, Kyōkaen, and Shokusanjin 蜀山人 (born 1749), Japanese late Edo-period poet and fiction writer

See also

 Poetry
 List of years in poetry
 List of years in literature
 19th century in literature
 19th century in poetry
 Romantic poetry
 Golden Age of Russian Poetry (1800–1850)
 Weimar Classicism period in Germany, commonly considered to have begun in 1788  and to have ended either in 1805, with the death of Friedrich Schiller, or 1832, with the death of Goethe
 List of poets

Notes

19th-century poetry
Poetry